Coralie Bertrand  (born 10 April 1994) is a French rugby union and rugby sevens player.

She plays 15-a-side rugby for RC Chilly Mazarin in France.
 She was named in the  France squad for the Rugby sevens at the 2020 Summer Olympics.

References 

  
1994 births
Living people
French female rugby union players
French rugby sevens players
Olympic rugby sevens players of France
Rugby sevens players at the 2020 Summer Olympics
Sportspeople from Avignon
Medalists at the 2020 Summer Olympics
Olympic silver medalists for France
Olympic medalists in rugby sevens
France international women's rugby sevens players